Nelphe relegatum is a moth of the subfamily Arctiinae. It was described by Schaus in 1911. It is found the southern United States, Mexico, Costa Rica, Nicaragua, Guatemala and Peru.

References

External links

Euchromiina
Moths described in 1911